The 41st Kentucky Infantry Regiment was an infantry regiment from Kentucky that served in the Union Army for thirty-days, during the American Civil War.

Service 
The 41st Kentucky Regiment was organized and mustered in at Covington, Kentucky. The duration of the regiment's service was thirty-days to coincide with General Bragg's invasion of Kentucky, and was disbanded at the expiration of its term of service.

References

Bibliography 
 Unknown. (2006). Civil War Regiments from Kentucky and Tennessee. eBookOnDisk.com Pensacola, Florida. .

Units and formations of the Union Army from Kentucky
1863 establishments in Kentucky
Military units and formations disestablished in 1863
Military units and formations established in 1863